George Glover may refer to:

George Glover (cricketer) (1870–1938), South African cricketer
George Glover (engraver), English engraver
George B. Glover (1827–1885), American diplomat and commissioner to the Imperial Chinese Maritime Customs Service
George Glover (priest) (1779–1862), Anglican priest

See also
George Glover Campbell (1887–1967), Australian politician
Glover (surname)